Dervan or Derwan was an early duke of the Sorbs (fl. 615–636).

According to some historians and Emperor Constantine VII, Dervan was brother of the Unknown Archon, but some historians also think that Dervan may be his father, which is less likely. According to Serbian academic Tibor Živković, the migration could take place between 629 and 632, before Dervan joined Samo.

He is mentioned by Fredegar in his Latin chronicle as dux gente Surbiorum que ex genere Sclavinorum: "ruler of the people of the Surbi (Sorb autonym: Serbja, Serb autonym: Srbi) from the nation of the Sclavenians". He is the first ruler of the tribe mentioned by name. Fredegar records him being subordinate to the Franks for a long time and then joining the Slavic union of Samo. After the defeat of the Frankish king Dagobert I by king Samo near Wogastisburg in 631 or 632, Dervan declared independence from the Franks and "placed himself and his people under the rule of Samo". 

Dervan joined Samo in his subsequent wars against the Franks. Further reports of Fredegar imply that Dervan and his people lived to the east of the Saxon Saale. The reference to Dervan in 631/632 is also the first written confirmation of the presence of Slavs north of the Ore Mountains.

He was fighting against Thuringia 631-634 and Dervan was finally defeated by duke Radulf, governor of Thuringia in 636.

References

Further reading

Curta, Florin. The Making of the Slavs: History and Archaeology of the Lower Danube Region, c. 500–700. Cambridge: Cambridge University Press, 2001. .

Early Sorbian people
7th-century rulers in Europe
7th-century Slavs
Slavic warriors